Bhaskar, better known as Bommarillu Bhaskar, is an Indian film director. In his early career, he worked as associate director on films Bhadra and Arya. His directorial debut Bommarillu starring Siddarth Narayan and Genelia D'souza earned him two Nandi Awards, for best debut director and best original screenplay. His next venture, Parugu starring Allu Arjun was a box office hit. Orange starring Ram Charan was his next film, which gained mixed response. His fourth film was Ongole Githa, a revenge drama which was a box office and critical failure. His next film was the Tamil-language Bangalore Naatkal starring Arya, Rana Daggubati, Samantha Ruth Prabhu, Sri Divya, and Bobby Simha which released in 2016.

Early life
Bhaskar was born in Vellore, Tamil Nadu and was a student of the Film and Television Institute of Tamil Nadu, Chennai.

Filmography 

 All films are in Telugu unless noted otherwise

Collaborations

References

External links
 

Living people
21st-century Indian film directors
Telugu film directors
M.G.R. Government Film and Television Training Institute alumni
Nandi Award winners
People from Vellore
Tamil film directors
Film directors from Tamil Nadu
Year of birth missing (living people)